José Mario Pinto Paz (born 27 September 1997) is a Honduran professional footballer who plays as a midfielder for Olimpia.

International career
He made his debut for the Honduras national football team on 13 October 2021 in a World Cup qualifier against Jamaica.

References

Living people
1997 births
Honduran footballers
Honduras international footballers
Liga Nacional de Fútbol Profesional de Honduras players
C.D. Olimpia players
Footballers at the 2020 Summer Olympics
Olympic footballers of Honduras
Association football forwards
Pan American Games medalists in football
Pan American Games silver medalists for Honduras
Medalists at the 2019 Pan American Games
Footballers at the 2019 Pan American Games